Tonny and Þonny are given names. Tonny is a diminutive Swedish, Danish, Finnish, Dutch, and Norwegian unisex form of the given names Antonia, Antonius, Anton, Antoon, Anthonis, Anthoon as well as a Scandianvian masculine version of the name Toni and pet form of names ending with the element "-ton" that is popular in Finland, Denmark, Sweden, Norway, the Netherlands, Indonesia, South Africa, Namibia, Suriname, Republic of Karelia, Estonia and Greenland. Þonny is a feminine given name that is a form of Torny.

Given names

Female
 Tonny Ahm (1914-1993), Danish badminton player
 Tonny de Jong (born 1974), Dutch speed skater
 Tonny Holst-Christensen (fl. 1956–1962), Danish badminton player
 Tonny Zwollo (born 1942), Dutch architect

Male
 Tonny Roy Ayomi (born 1991), Indonesian footballer
 Tonny Azevedo (born 1969), Brazilian cyclist
 Tonny Brochmann (born 1989), Danish footballer
 Tonny Brogaard (formerly Tonny Nielsen, born 1984), Danish football goalkeeper
 Tonny Jensen (born 1971), Australian basketball player
 Tonny Kristians (AKA Kristians Tonny, 1907–1977), Dutch surrealist painter
 Tonny Mupariwa (born 1991), Zimbabwean cricketer
 Tonny Bruins Slot (born 1947), Dutch football coach
 Tonny Sorensen (born 1964), Danish entrepreneur and creative director
 Tonny Albert Springer, known as T. A. Springer, (1926 – 2011), Dutch mathematician
 Tonny Temple (born 2000), American soccer player
 Tonny van Ede (1924 – 2011), Dutch football player
 Tonny Vilhena (born 1995), Dutch footballer
 Tonny Wamulwa (born 1989), Zambian long-distance athlete
 Tonny, Character in Pusher (film series)

Nickname
 Tonny Eyk pseudonym of Teun Eikelboom, (born 1940), male Dutch musician and entertainer
 Tonny Kessler, nickname of Hermann Anton Joseph Kessler (1889 – 1960), male  Dutch football player
 Tonny Koeswoyo, nickname of Koestono Koeswoyo (1936 – 27 March 1987), male Indonesian rock musician
 Tonny Mols, nickname of Antonio Mols, (born 1969), male Belgian footballer
 Tonny Sanabria, nickname of Arnaldo Antonio Sanabria Ayala (born 1996), male Paraguayan professional footballer
 Tonny van der Linden, nickname of Anthonie van der Linden (1932 – 2017), male Dutch footballer
 Tonny van Lierop, nickname of Antoine Robert Onslow van Lierop (1910 – 1982), male Dutch field hockey player

Middle name
 Kipoi Tonny Nsubuga (born 1978), Ugandan politician

See also

Tonni (name)
Tony (name)
Toney (name)

Notes

 Danish given names
 Dutch given names
 Finnish given names
 Norwegian given names
 Swedish given names